Bellis is a genus of flowering plants in the family Asteraceae.

The group is native to Europe, the Mediterranean and northern Africa. One species has been introduced into North America and others into other parts of the world. The genus includes the familiar common daisy Bellis perennis.

Description
They have simple erect stems, and most species have basal leaves. They have radiate flower heads that are produced one per stem.

Species
 Accepted species

Possible infrageneric groups  
 Bellis sect. Brachyscome (Cass.) Baill.
 Bellis sect. Brachystephium (Less.) Kuntze
 Bellis sect. Lagenophora (Cass.) Baill.
 Bellis sect. Silphiosperma (Steetz) Kuntze

References

External links

 Flora Europaea: Bellis

 
Asteraceae genera
Garden plants
Taxa named by Carl Linnaeus